Strah od monotonije (trans. The Fear of Monotony) is the second and last studio album by the Serbian band Pekinška Patka, released in 1981. Unlike its predecessor which was a punk rock album, Strah od monotonije featured the post-punk sound, and is the first post-punk album released in Serbia.

Track listing

Personnel 
 Mare — Marinko Vukmanović; bass, voice [hypnotic voices], backing vocals
 Cila — Laslo Pihler; drums
 Bale — Zoran Bulatović; guitar, keyboards, backing vocals
 Čonta — Nebojša Čonkić; vocals, performer [Čontajzer]

Additional personnel 
 Geza Lenert — photography
 Slobodan Konjović — producer, recorded by

References 
 Strah od monotonije at Discogs
 EX YU ROCK enciklopedija 1960–2006, Janjatović Petar; 

Pekinška Patka albums
1981 albums
Post-punk albums by Serbian artists
Jugoton albums